Ahinful is a surname. Notable people with the surname include:

Augustine Ahinful (born 1974), Ghanaian footballer
Kwaku Duah Ahinful (born 1985), Ghanaian footballer

Ghanaian surnames